Judy's Book is a U.S. social search tool and online yellow pages to locate and review local businesses and professional services.



History
In 2004, friends and entrepreneurs Andy Sack (Founders Co-op, Kefta, Abuzz, Firefly Network) and Chris DeVore (Founders Co-op, Sapient Corporation, Adjacency) founded Judy's Book with a US$2.5 million seed funding that they were able to raise. The social networking-based local search tool allows small businesses to promote themselves and users to browse through listings to locate businesses and professionals in their area and rate and review their experiences. According to the official website, the idea of Judy's Book was inspired by co-founder Andy Sack's mother-in-law, Judy Albert, who kept a "little green book" full of lists and shopping tips and other favorites that she'd share with family and friends to help them find "the best of everything".

The website allows small, medium and large sized businesses to submit all promotions and deals they have so that users can then easily navigate through them and keep up with the latest offerings. Registered users can browse through local and online stores and even post deals, coupons or any other sales they learn of and further enhance existing postings by providing more detailed information and adding personal reviews, ratings and tags.

Marketing tactics
In 2005, in an effort to get the website off the ground, the company offered iPods to anyone who submitted 50 reviews of local businesses. While the then-owners and founders of Judy's Book, Andy and Chris, refused to reveal how many people won iPods or how many reviews were submitted, Sack announced that their marketing efforts were successful as the website saw a 5060% increase in reviews and member registrations every month.

In 2006, the website gave out $100 gift certificates every day from February 16 until March 5 to the person who had written the most reviews that day.

Also in 2006, in an attempt to further increase traffic to the website, Judy's Book announced that it was partnering with Local.com. All reviews written on Judy's Book were included in Local.com's search results.

In 2006, Judy's Book claimed trademark on the term social search.

Collapse
The company changed focus in 2006 when the original business model looked to be failing. The company moved towards the shopping angle and local deals.  After burning through $10.5M in capital that was raised over the three years of its operation, and unable to generate enough revenue to keep the website afloat, the company began looking for a new buyer. The CEO announced the company would be shutting down operations in October 2007.

Change of ownership and management
In October 2008, nearly one year from the day Judy's Book laid off nearly all of its staff and was declared "deadpooled", Seattle-based angel investors Geoff Entress Madrona Venture Group, David Niu (founder of BuddyTV) and Andy Liu (CEO of BuddyTV) bought the company from the original founders, Andy and Chris. The group are currently working together on another venture capital, Founders Co-op. However, in an interview with one of the owners, Andy Liu noted that the purchase of Judy's Book took place before they invested in the Internet incubator, Founders Co-op. While none of the investors were willing to reveal how much was paid in its acquisition, it is assumed to be far less than the $10.5M the original founders had put in the start-up. The website is currently led by General Manager, Ali Alami.

In June 2012, the new management of Judy's Book, Ali Alami, launched KidScore which is an out of glance measure of a locations friendliness towards children.

References

Internet search engines
American review websites
Companies based in Seattle
Internet properties established in 2004
Social search